Colin Payne may refer to:

 Colin Payne (baseball), baseball player
 Colin Payne (cricketer) (born 1945), Barbadian cricketer